Panaphelix marmorata is a moth of the family Tortricidae. It was first described by Lord Walsingham in 1907. It is endemic to the Hawaiian island of Maui.

The wingspan is 32–37 mm, making it one of the largest Hawaiian Tortricidae.

External links

Archipini
Endemic moths of Hawaii
Moths described in 1907